The 1978 Volvo International was a men's tennis tournament played on outdoor clay courts in North Conway, New Hampshire in the United States and was part of the 1978 Colgate-Palmolive Grand Prix. The tournament began on July 31, 1978. First-seeded Eddie Dibbs won the singles title.

Finals

Singles

 Eddie Dibbs defeated  John Alexander 6–4, 6–4
 It was Dibbs' 4th title of the year and the 18th of his career.

Doubles
 Robin Drysdale /  Van Winitsky defeated  Mike Fishbach /  Bernard Mitton 6–3, 6–4
 It was Drysdale's only title of the year and the 1st of his career. It was Winitsky's 2nd title of the year and the 2nd of his career.

References

External links
 ITF tournament edition details

 
Volvo International
Volvo International
Volvo International
Volvo International
Volvo International
Volvo International